Bret Ryan Hemphill (born December 17, 1971) is an American former professional baseball player who played one season for the Anaheim Angels of Major League Baseball (MLB). He also played 11 seasons in the minor leagues in the Angels' organization.  He currently resides in Roseville, California and is a coach for the traveling team of Golden Spikes Baseball. In June 2017, as the coach of the Golden Spikes Cowboys, with assistant coach Cory Barker, he led the Cowboys to a 10-1 record at Cooperstown Dreams Park and finishing 2nd out of 104 teams and hitting an astounding 53 home runs in 11 games. He currently coaches  the Golden Spikes 11u team, the Gators. He also coached the Sierra College Wolverine's baseball team in Rocklin, California.

External links

1971 births
Living people
Anaheim Angels players
Baseball coaches from California
Baseball players from California
Boise Hawks players
Cal State Fullerton Titans baseball players
Cedar Rapids Kernels players
Edmonton Trappers players
Erie SeaWolves players
Lake Elsinore Storm players
Major League Baseball catchers
Midland Angels players
People from Santa Clara, California
Sportspeople from Roseville, California
Vancouver Canadians players
Anchorage Glacier Pilots players
Mat-Su Miners players